A grooving plane, plow plane, or plough plane is a plane  used in woodworking to make grooves and (with some of the metal versions) small rabbets. They are traditionally used for drawer bottoms or rear walls.

References

 

 

Planes